Michel Bury (born 28 February 1952) is a French former sport shooter who competed in the 1984 Summer Olympics, in the 1992 Summer Olympics, and in the 1996 Summer Olympics.

References

1952 births
Living people
French male sport shooters
ISSF rifle shooters
Olympic shooters of France
Shooters at the 1984 Summer Olympics
Shooters at the 1992 Summer Olympics
Shooters at the 1996 Summer Olympics
Olympic silver medalists for France
Olympic medalists in shooting
Medalists at the 1984 Summer Olympics
20th-century French people